Courtland is a station stop on the RTA light rail Green Line in Shaker Heights, Ohio, located at the intersection of Courtland Boulevard, Manchester Road, Montgomery Road and Shaker Boulevard (Ohio State Route 87).

History

The station opened on May 20, 1915, when rail service on what is now Shaker Boulevard was extended from Fontenay Road 0.6 miles (1 km) east to Courtland Boulevard. The extension included a wye extending southward on Courtland Boulevard to South Woodland Road to the entrance of the Shaker Heights Country Club. The new country club, which opened ten days later, was essentially a relocation of the Euclid Country Club which was displaced from its location at the top of Cedar Glen Parkway when the Euclid Heights subdivision was developed. The rail line was built by Cleveland Interurban Railroad and initially operated by the Cleveland Railway.

In 1923 a station building with a passenger waiting room was constructed on Shaker Boulevard median northeast of the Courtland Boulevard intersection. The building, costing $8,150, was similar to, but smaller than, the building built at the same time and still standing at Lynnfield Road, which was then the end of the Van Aken line. The building also housed tobacco and newspaper stands. The newspapers were delivered to the station by rapid transit.

Also in 1923, most of the wye along Courtland Boulevard was abandoned, as the country club was generating little ridership. A short wye at Shaker Boulevard was retained to turn the cars around. In 1928, the line was extended east along Shaker Boulevard to Warrensville Center Road.

The station building received little use after the line was extended, and it was too small for other uses. Finally, the upkeep on the station was deemed too expensive so the station building was razed on October 15, 1967. There is no trace of the building today.

In 1980 and 1981, the Green and Blue Lines were completely renovated with new track, ballast, poles and wiring, and new stations were built along the line. The renovated line along Shaker Boulevard opened on October 11, 1980.

Station layout
The station comprises two side platforms, the westbound platform east of the intersection, and the eastbound platform west of the intersection, with a small shelter on the westbound platform.

Notable places nearby
Hathaway Brown School
Shaker Heights Country Club

References

 

Green Line (RTA Rapid Transit)
Railway stations in the United States opened in 1915
1915 establishments in Ohio